The 1983 Allan Cup was the Canadian senior ice hockey championship for the 1982–83 senior "A" season.  The event was hosted by the Cambridge Hornets in Cambridge, Ontario.  The 1983 playoff marked the 75th time that the Allan Cup has been awarded.

Teams
Cambridge Hornets (Eastern Canadian Champions)
St. Boniface Mohawks (Western Canadian Champions)

Best-of-Seven Series
Cambridge Hornets 4 - St. Boniface Mohawks 3
Cambridge Hornets 7 - St. Boniface Mohawks 6
Cambridge Hornets 9 - St. Boniface Mohawks 2
Cambridge Hornets 4 - St. Boniface Mohawks 1

External links
Allan Cup archives 
Allan Cup website

Allan Cup
Sport in Cambridge, Ontario